This is a list of Nigerien writers.

 Idé Adamou (1951– ), poet and novelist
 Ousmane Amadou (1948– ), poet, novelist, lawyer and journalist
 Djibo Bakary (1922–1998), politician and writer
 Andrée Clair, born and died in France (1916–1982), ethnographer and children's writer
 Mahamadou Halilou Sabbo (1937–2006), novelist and playwright
 Boubou Hama (1906–1982), politician and writer 
 Hawad (1950– ), Tuareg poet currently living in France
 Hélène Kaziende (1967– ), teacher, journalist and short story writer
 Salihu Kwantagora (1929– ), songwriter and poet
 Abdoulaye Mamani (1932–1993), poet, novelist and trade unionist
 Ide Oumarou (1937–2002), politician, diplomat and writer
 Andre Salifou (1942– ), politician, diplomat and academic

See also
 Culture of Niger
 List of African writers by country
 List of Nigeriens

References

Nigerien
Writers
 
Niger